The Finn was a sailing event on the Sailing at the 1972 Summer Olympics program in Kiel-Schilksee. Seven races were scheduled and completed. 35 sailors, on 35 boats, from 35 nations competed.

Race schedule 
Due to the interruption of the Games on 6 September 1972, the race was postponed till 7 September. Then the race conditions were unsuitable. Heavy fog and poor wind conditions made it not possible to race until 8 September. Also the medal ceremony was also postponed until 8 September.

Course area and course configuration 
For the Finn course area C(harlie) was used. The location (54°27'30'’N, 10°17'450'’E) points to the center of the 1.5nm radius circle. The distance between mark 1 and 3 was about 1.5nm.

Final results 
Due to the time limit for finishing of half an hour after the winner and light air conditions, only three Finn sailors were able to finish in race six.

Daily standings

Further reading

References 

Finn
Finn competitions